The hazy band of stars of the Milky Way was referred to as the "River of Heaven" or the "Silvery River" in Eastern Asian and Chinese mythology. The River of Heaven is a silver river flowing through the heavens.
The Silvery River of Heaven is part of the "The Cowherd and the Weaver Girl" myth. The Cowherd and the Weaver Girl is a romantic Chinese folk tale. The story tells of the romance between Zhinü (the weaver girl, symbolizing the star Vega) and Niulang (the cowherd, symbolizing the star Altair). Their love was not allowed, and thus they were banished to opposite sides of the heavenly river. Once a year, on the seventh day of the seventh lunar month, a flock of magpies would form a bridge over the heavenly river to reunite the lovers for a single day.

Literature 
The tale has been alluded to in many literary works. One of the most famous was the poem by Qin Guan (1049–1100) during the Song dynasty:
Du Fu (712–770) of the Tang dynasty wrote a poem about the heavenly river:

See also 

 Milky Way (mythology)
 List of names for the Milky Way

References 

Chinese mythology
Milky Way
Chinese culture
Mythology
Stars